Canelones is a Uruguayan municipality located in the department of Canelones. Its seat is the city of Canelones.

Location 
The municipality is located in the central-western region of the department of Canelones, south of the creek Canelón Grande.

Populated places in the municipality of Canelones 
 Canelones (department capital and municipality seat)
 Juanicó
 Barrio Remanso
 Parada Cabrera
 Villa Arejo
 Paso Palomeque
 Paso Espinosa

References 

Canelones Department
Canelones